Brassaiopsis hainla is a species of shrub in the family Araliaceae. It is used as fodder by the farmers in Nepal.

References

hainla
Bodybuilding supplements
Trees of Nepal